Donaldo is a given name. Notable people with the name include:

 Donaldo Arza (born 1946), Panamanian track and field athlete
 Donaldo González (born 1971), Panamanian footballer
 Donaldo Macedo (born 1950), American academic
 Donaldo Méndez (born 1978), Venezuelan baseball player
 Donaldo Morales (born 1982), Honduran footballer
 Donaldo Ortiz Colín (born 1961), Mexican politician
 Donaldo Ernesto Reyes (born 1939), Honduran lawyer and politician

See also
 Donaldo "Dondon" Hontiveros (born 1977), Filipino basketball player
Luis Donaldo Colosio Murrieta (1950–1994), Mexican politician and presidential candidate